Qeshlaq-e Bahman Shir (also Romanized as Qeshlāq-e Bahman Shīr) is a village in Tazeh Kand Rural District, Tazeh Kand District, Parsabad County, Ardabil Province, Iran. At the 2006 census, its population was 9, in 4 families.

References 

Towns and villages in Parsabad County